Puppalaguda is a village in Manikonda municipality in Ranga Reddy district, TS, India. It falls under Gandipet mandal.
Greenspace Prime Apartments BRC apartments, GOLDEN ORIOLE gated community ,  greenspace Tulasi and Peetani Coconuts are the famous places in this area

References

Villages in Ranga Reddy district